Reefer and the Model is a 1988 Irish film written and directed by Joe Comerford. It concerns Reefer, a former Irish Republican Army man who operates a ferry using an old trawler between the Galway coast and the Aran Islands; his friends Spider and Badger; and the pregnant Teresa ("the Model"), who has abandoned a life of drugs and prostitution in England. The group become involved in the armed robbery of a post office and are pursued by the Gardaí. The film premièred in Galway in August 1988.

Awards 

Reefer and the Model won the Europa Prize at the Barcelona Festival, and Best Feature at the Celtic Film Festival in Wales. At the 1988 European Film Awards, the film was nominated for Best Young Film, Carol Scanlan was nominated for Best Actress, and Ray McBride was nominated for Best Supporting Actor.

Cast

 Ian McElhinney – Reefer
 Carol Scanlan – Teresa 'the Model'
 Sean Lawlor – Spider
 Ray McBride – Badger
 Eve Watkinson – The Mother
 Birdy Sweeney – Instant Photo
 Fionn Comerford – Messenger Boy
 John Lillis – Porter
 Henry Comerford – Waiter
 Paraic Breathnach – Quayside Fisherman
 Maire Chinsealach – Island Woman
 Dave Duffy – Sergeant
 Rosina Brown – The Blonde
 Little John Nee – Boy Soldier
 Seán Ó Coisdealbha – Rossaveal Skipper
 Noel Spain – Boatman
 Peter Fitzgerald – Bank Guard
 Dick Donaghue – Bank Teller
 Máire Ní Mháille – Bank Teller
 Michael Rowland – Older Bank Guard (as Mick Rowland)
 Patrick Blackaby – 1st Tinker Guard
 Uinseann Mac Thomáis – 2nd Tinker Guard
 Deirdre Lawless – Policewoman
 Gary McMahon – Young Guard

References

External links
 
 
 

1988 films
1988 drama films
Films shot in the Republic of Ireland
Irish drama films
1980s English-language films
English-language Irish films